Kansi may refer to:

People
 Kasi (tribe)
 Mir Aimal Kansi (1964–2002), Pakistani perpetrator of the 1993 shootings at CIA Headquarters

Places
 Kansi, Iran, a village in West Azerbaijan Province, Iran
 Kansi, Shan State, a village in Taunggyi Township, of Shan State in Burma (Myanmar)
 Kansi, Kachin State, a village in Hpakant Township, of Kachin State in Burma (Myanmar)

Food
 Cansi, a Filipino bone marrow soup